Jalaeipour may refer to:

Hamidreza Jalaeipour (born 1957), Iranian sociologist and professor at the University of Tehran
Mohammadreza Jalaeipour (born 1982), Iranian sociologist and political activist (the son of Hamidreza Jalaeipour)